France Nature Environnement (FNE) is a national federation of associations for the protection of nature and the environment in France. Created in 1968 as the French Federation of Societies for the Protection of Nature ( it was recognised as having public benefits in 1976. 

As an umbrella organisation, FNE speaks on behalf of a movement of almost 90000 members in some 9000 associations in France and its overseas territories, grouped into 46 member organisations. 

References

Environmental organizations based in France